Predrag Kovačević, known by his nickname Kova, is a Bosnian guitarist. He first found mainstream success as a 1980s lineup member of a Bosnian garage rock band Zabranjeno Pušenje.

Career 
Kovačević joined a Sarajevo-based rock band Zabranjeno Pušenje in 1986, after their lead guitarist Mustafa Čengić left. As a lead guitarist, he performed on their two studio albums: Pozdrav iz zemlje Safari (1987) and Male priče o velikoj ljubavi (1989). In early 1990, he left the band with some other members.

In 2018 and 2019, Kovačević had some guest appearances at live concerts of Nele Karajlić, former lead vocalist of Zabranjeno Pušenje.

Kovačević has been living in Edmonton, AB since the 1990s.

Discography 

Zabranjeno pušenje
 Pozdrav iz zemlje Safari (1987)
 Male priče o velikoj ljubavi (1989)

References

External links
 Predrag Kovačević on Discogs

Year of birth missing (living people)
Living people
Bosnia and Herzegovina guitarists
Bosnia and Herzegovina male guitarists
Bosnia and Herzegovina rock musicians
Bosnia and Herzegovina emigrants to Canada
Zabranjeno pušenje members
Yugoslav musicians